Disney's Wide World of Sports Spirit Award is presented annually to college football's most inspirational individual or team. The award is one of 21 that are part of the National College Football Awards Association (NCFAA).

Previous winners

References

College football awards
Disney-related lists
Awards established in 1996
1996 establishments in the United States